Perfectly Imperfect at the Ryman is a live album by American country musician Margo Price, recorded during her three date residency at the Ryman Auditorium in May 2018. The album was released on May 21, 2020, to celebrate the second anniversary of the residency, and exclusively through Bandcamp to generate donations for the MusiCares COVID-19 Relief Fund.

The album was prepared following the delay of Price's third album, That's How Rumors Get Started, and planned tour in promotion of that album due to the burgeoning COVID-19 pandemic. In promotion of the album and its proceeds for the COVID-19 Relief, Price released a video of the performance of "All American Made" from the concerts.

Track listing

References

2020 live albums
Margo Price albums
Loma Vista Recordings albums